Rockville Historic District may refer to:

Rockville Historic District (Rockville, Connecticut), listed on the NRHP in Connecticut
Rockville Historic District (Rockville, Indiana), listed on the NRHP in Indiana
Rockville Historic District (Rockville, South Carolina), listed on the NRHP in South Carolina